Lepidodinium is a genus of dinoflagellates belonging to the family Gymnodiniaceae.

Species:

Lepidodinium chlorophorum 
Lepidodinium viride

References

Gymnodiniales
Dinoflagellate genera